Neosprucea is a genus of flowering plants in the family Salicaceae. There are nine species native to Panama and northern South America.

Species include:
 Neosprucea grandiflora
 Neosprucea melastomatoides
 Neosprucea montana
 Neosprucea paterna
 Neosprucea pedicellata
 Neosprucea rimachii
 Neosprucea sararensis
 Neosprucea tenuisepala
 Neosprucea wilburiana

References

Salicaceae
Salicaceae genera
Taxonomy articles created by Polbot
Taxa named by Hermann Otto Sleumer